Rostock is a district in the north of Mecklenburg-Vorpommern, Germany. It is bounded by (from the west and clockwise) the district Nordwestmecklenburg, the Baltic Sea, the district-free city Rostock and the districts Vorpommern-Rügen, Mecklenburgische Seenplatte and Ludwigslust-Parchim. The district seat is the town Güstrow.

History 
Rostock District was established by merging the former districts of Bad Doberan and Güstrow as part of the local government reform of September 2011. The name of the district was decided by referendum on 4 September 2011. The project name for the district was Mittleres Mecklenburg.

Geographic features
There are a number of lakes within the boundaries of Rostock district, including:
 Inselsee
 Hohen Sprenzer See
 Krakower See

Towns and municipalities

References